Millie Brown (born 15 January 2001) is an Australian rules footballer playing for the Western Bulldogs in the AFL Women's (AFLW) competition. She has previously played for Geelong.

AFLW career
Brown was drafted by Geelong with the club's first pick and the 11th overall in the 2019 AFL Women's draft. She is the daughter of 84-game Geelong AFL player Paul Brown and was selected under the father-daughter rule. Brown made her debut against  at Fremantle Oval in the opening round of the 2020 season.
On 27 July 2021, Geelong announced that Brown will be inactive for the upcoming 2021-22 AFLW Season.
In June 2022, Brown was traded to Western Bulldogs.

Personal life
Brown is currently studying a Bachelor of Psychology (Honours) at Deakin University.

References

External links

2001 births
Living people
Geelong Football Club (AFLW) players
Murray Bushrangers players (NAB League Girls)
Australian rules footballers from Victoria (Australia)